Neighbourhood is the second solo album released by session drummer Manu Katché.  While his first offering, It's About Time, was considered a rock/funk album, Neighbourhood is solid jazz.  Katché composed all of the music on the album.

Track listing
"November 99" – 6:02  	    	 
"Number One" – 6:13 	  	
"Lullaby" – 6:16 	  	
"Good Influence" – 5:01 	  	
"February Sun" – 4:50 	  	
"No Rush" – 5:52 	  	
"Lovely Walk" – 6:20 	  	
"Take Off and Land" – 4:02	  	
"Miles Away" – 4:14 	  	
"Rose" – 6:11

Personnel 
Manu Katché – percussion, drums
Sławomir Kurkiewicz – double bass
Marcin Wasilewski – piano
Jan Garbarek – saxophones
Tomasz Stańko – trumpet

References

2005 albums
Neighbourhood
ECM Records albums
Albums produced by Manfred Eicher